This list of actors with Hollywood Walk of Fame motion picture stars includes all actors who have been inducted into the Hollywood Walk of Fame in the category of motion pictures. This list does not include any non-acting professionals with motion picture stars, nor does it include any directors or producers with acting credits that are minor when compared to their directing and producing credits. This list also excludes all actors with television or live theatre stars on the Walk of Fame, as well as all animal actors and fictional characters.

The star locations and the years of the induction ceremonies are available on the official Hollywood Walk of Fame website maintained by the Hollywood Chamber of Commerce. The years of birth and death are available in the biographical articles on the Los Angeles Times Hollywood Star Walk website, with more accurate birth years from government records—such as birth certificates, census and military records—for some actors via their Wikipedia article sources.

Statistics

A total of 901 actors appear in the list—493 males and 408 females. There are 178 Academy Award winners for acting in the list—89 males and 89 females—and 172 non-winning nominees—95 males and 77 females. There are 552 actors with no Academy Award nominations for acting in the list—309 males and 243 females.

The youngest living male in the list is Daniel Radcliffe while the youngest living female is Scarlett Johansson. The oldest living female is Janis Paige and the oldest living male is Mel Brooks. The youngest at induction is Patty McCormack at 15 years of age, while Bobby Driscoll was the youngest male actor, inducted at 23 years of age. The oldest at induction were Yakima Canutt, Gloria Stuart, and Gina Lollobrigida, all at 90 years of age. The average age at induction is about 54, with males averaging about 57 and females averaging about 51. Posthumously-awarded stars are not included in the average calculations.

Since the initial star installations of 1958–60 when 660 film actors received stars—165 being posthumously inducted—there have been 15 additional posthumous stars awarded to film actors: Paul Robeson in 1978, Dorothy Dandridge in 1983, Philip Ahn and Eleanor Powell in 1984, Smiley Burnette and Steve McQueen in 1986, Natalie Wood in 1987, Bruce Lee in 1993, Cleavon Little and Spanky McFarland in 1994, John Belushi in 2004, Chris Farley in 2005, Pedro Gonzalez Gonzalez in 2008, Richard Burton in 2013, Toshiro Mifune in 2016, and Ray Liotta in 2023.

, more than 2,600 stars are on the Hollywood Walk of Fame among all five categories: motion pictures, television, recording, radio and live performance. Stars for motion picture actors comprise about one third of all Walk of Fame stars.

Table key

List of actors
The list is designed to be sortable by clicking on any of the column headings; however, sorting is only possible if JavaScript is enabled in your web browser. If viewing on a mobile device, switch to the desktop view to enable sorting (click on the word Desktop at the bottom of the page).

The initial sort order is by actor surnames. Clicking the same column heading a second time sorts in the reverse order. For example:
 to see the actors in order along Hollywood Boulevard and Vine Street, click on the Address column heading; reverse the order by clicking the same column heading a second time
 to group the actors with males separated from females, click the second column heading; click once for females first or twice for males first
 to see all the actors sorted from youngest to oldest, click the Age column heading once; click again to reverse the order.

See also

 List of all stars on the Hollywood Walk of Fame
 List of all actors with Academy Award nominations

References

External links

 Hollywood Walk of Fame Starfinder at the official website
 Hollywood Star Walk: LA Times - an interactive map of star locations with photos

Hollywood
Hollywood Walk of Fame
Hollywood Walk of Fame